Airport is a 1970s film series consisting of four airplane-themed disaster films: Airport, Airport 1975, Airport '77 and The Concorde ... Airport '79. They are based on the 1968 novel Airport by Arthur Hailey. The four films grossed $387.5 million worldwide.

The only actor who appeared in all four films is George Kennedy, in his recurring role of Joe Patroni, who progresses from a chief mechanic, to a vice president of operations, to a consultant, to an airline pilot.

Critical reception
The first Airport film from 1970 has been praised for the film's influence on the disaster genre and its "camp value". However, the movie's star, Burt Lancaster, said in a 1971 reaction to its ten Academy Award nominations that the film was "the biggest piece of junk ever made."

The New Yorker film critic Pauline Kael characterized Airport 1975 as "cut-rate swill", produced on a TV-movie budget by mercenary businessmen. Vincent Canby of The New York Times called it "a silly sequel with a 747".

In a review of Airport '77, a critic in The New York Times wrote that it "looks less like the work of a director and writers than like a corporate decision."

Variety′s review of The Concorde ... Airport '79 called the film "Definitely not for sophisticates, 'Concorde' is a throwback to the old popcorn genre, and rather enjoyable at that" but noted that "unintentional comedy still seems the 'Airport' series' forte". The New York Times''' critic Janet Maslin wrote disparagingly that "'Concorde' is enough to persuade anyone to stay on the ground."

Box office receipts declined as the series progressed, and no further Airport films were produced, although media reports in the early 1980s suggested a fifth film was considered.

The 1980 comedy Airplane!, though more specifically a parody of the 1957 film Zero Hour! (itself a precursor to the Airport concept, with a screenplay by Hailey), was marketed as a spoof of the Airport series. It spawned its own follow-up, Airplane II: The Sequel'', in 1982.

Box office performance

See also
 List of film series with four entries

References

External links
 
 
 
 

 
Film series introduced in 1970
Drama film series
Thriller film series